Riverside Theater is a concert hall located in Milwaukee, Wisconsin. The venue seats 2,450 people and hosts many different recording artists and shows. It is leased by the Pabst Theater Foundation.

History
The building, which opened in 1928, was designed by local architects Charles Kirchhoff and Thomas Rose, who designed many theaters, including the Palace Theater in New York City. The theater underwent major renovations in 1984.

The theater has a theatre organ, made by Wurlitzer.

The Theater hosted Milwaukee's Liberace (for 6 nights) in 1986 before he died a year later. It hosted Waukesha's BoDeans in 1994, =polka parody musician "Weird Al" Yankovic in 1999, and The Smashing Pumpkins and Bon Iver in 2011. The Ink Spots from Indianapolis were one of the first acts to perform there in 1943. The theater hosted Kiss on the Dressed to Kill Tour in 1975. The theater still runs and operates.

References

External links
Pabst/Riverside/Turner Hall web page

Theatres in Milwaukee
Music venues in Wisconsin
Public venues with a theatre organ